The  is an electric multiple unit (EMU) train type operated by the private railway operator Shin-Keisei Electric Railway on the Shin-Keisei Line in Chiba Prefecture, Japan, since May 2005.

Design
Built by Nippon Sharyo in Aichi Prefecture, the N800 series design is based on the Keisei 3000 series EMU. Although built as 6-car sets, the units are designed to be lengthened to 8-car sets in the future if required. The N800 series is also intended for use on inter-running services to and from the Keisei Chiba Line.

Formations
, the fleet consists of three six-car sets based at Kunugiyama Depot with four motored (M) cars and two trailer (T) cars, formed as shown below, with the Mc1 car at the Tsudanuma end.

 "x" in the car numbers stands for the set number.
 The M2 and M7 cars are each fitted with two single-arm-type pantographs.
 The T6 cars are designated as having mild air-conditioning.

Interior
Passenger accommodation consists of longitudinal bench seating throughout. Each car has priority seating at one end, and the two end cars each have a wheelchair space located close to the cab end. Some of the bench seats have metal steps on the underside, allowing them to be detached and used as steps for evacuating the train in emergencies.

History

The first set, N811, entered service on 29 May 2005.

The first set to receive Shin-Keisei's new pink corporate livery introduced in 2014 was N821 in February 2015.

The fourth set, N841, entered service on 22 December 2015. It is the first Shin-Keisei trainset to feature LED lighting and LCD passenger information displays from new. A fifth set, N851, was delivered in August 2018, entering service on 22 August of that year.

References

External links

 Official Shin-Keisei N800 series information 
 Shin-Keisei N800 series (Nippon Sharyo) 
 Shin-Keisei N800 series (Japan Railfan Magazine) 

Electric multiple units of Japan
Train-related introductions in 2005
1500 V DC multiple units of Japan
Nippon Sharyo multiple units